Coleophora berlandella is a moth of the family Coleophoridae. It is found in Spain, Libya, Algeria, Tunisia and Turkmenistan.

The larvae feed on the leaves of Astragalus species including, A. barrovianus, A. xiphidioides and A. stevenianus.

References

berlandella
Moths described in 1956
Moths of Europe
Moths of Africa
Moths of Asia